The siege of Yorktown, also known as the Battle of Yorktown, the surrender at Yorktown, or the German battle because of the presence of Germans in all three armies, began September 28, 1781 and ended on October 19, 1781, in Yorktown, Virginia. It was a decisive victory by a combined force of the American Continental Army troops led by General George Washington with support from Marquis de Lafayette and French Army troops led by Comte de Rochambeau over the British Army commanded by British Lieutenant General Charles Cornwallis. 

The culmination of the Yorktown campaign, the siege of Yorktown was the last major land battle of the American Revolutionary War in the North American region, leading to the surrender of Cornwallis and the capture of both him and his army. The Continental Army's victory at Yorktown prompted the British government to negotiate an end to the conflict.

Overview 
In 1780, about 5,500 French soldiers landed in Rhode Island to help their American allies fight the British troops controlling New York City. Following the arrival of dispatches from France that included the possibility of support from the French West Indies fleet of the Comte de Grasse, disagreements arose between Washington and Rochambeau on whether to ask de Grasse for assistance in besieging New York or in military operations against a British army in Virginia. On the advice of Rochambeau, de Grasse informed them of his intent to sail to the Chesapeake Bay, where Cornwallis had taken command of the army. Cornwallis, at first given confusing orders by his superior officer, Henry Clinton, was eventually ordered to build a defensible deep-water port, which he began to do in Yorktown. Cornwallis' movements in Virginia were shadowed by a Continental Army force led by the Marquis de Lafayette.

The French and American armies united north of New York City during the summer of 1781. When word of de Grasse's decision arrived, both armies began moving south toward Virginia, engaging in tactics of deception to lead the British to believe a siege of New York was planned. De Grasse sailed from the West Indies and arrived at the Chesapeake Bay at the end of August, bringing additional troops and creating a naval blockade of Yorktown.  He was transporting 500,000 silver pesos collected from the citizens of Havana, Cuba, to fund supplies for the siege and payroll for the Continental Army. While in Santo Domingo, de Grasse met with Francisco Saavedra de Sangronis, an agent of King Charles III of Spain. De Grasse had planned to leave several of his warships in Santo Domingo. Saavedra promised the assistance of the Spanish Navy to protect the French merchant fleet, enabling de Grasse to sail north with all of his warships. In the beginning of September, he defeated a British fleet led by Sir Thomas Graves that came to relieve Cornwallis at the Battle of the Chesapeake. As a result of this victory, de Grasse blocked any reinforcement or escape by sea for Cornwallis and also disembarked the heavy siege guns required by the allied land forces. By late September, Washington and Rochambeau arrived, and the army and naval forces completely surrounded Cornwallis.

After initial preparations, the Americans and French built their first parallel and began the bombardment. With the British defense weakened, on October 14, 1781, Washington sent two columns to attack the last major remaining British outer defenses. A French column under Vicomte de Deux-Ponts took Redoubt No. 9 and an American column under Lieutenant Colonel Alexander Hamilton took Redoubt No. 10. With these defenses taken, the allies were able to finish their second parallel. With the Franco-American artillery closer and its bombardment more intense than ever, the British position began to deteriorate rapidly. Cornwallis asked for capitulation terms on October 17. After two days of negotiation, the surrender ceremony occurred on October 19; Cornwallis was absent from the ceremony. With the capture of more than 7,000 British soldiers, negotiations between the United States and Great Britain began, resulting in the Treaty of Paris of 1783.

The battlegrounds are preserved and interpreted today as part of Colonial National Historical Park.

Prelude

Franco-American cooperation

On December 20, 1780, Benedict Arnold sailed from New York with 1,500 British troops to Portsmouth, Virginia. He first raided Richmond, defeating the defending militia, from January 5–7 before falling back to Portsmouth. Admiral Destouches, who arrived in Newport, Rhode Island, in July 1780 with a fleet transporting 5,500 soldiers, was encouraged by Washington and French Lieutenant General Rochambeau to move his fleet south, and launch a joint land-naval attack on Arnold's troops. The Marquis de Lafayette was sent south with 1,200 men to help with the assault. However, Destouches was reluctant to dispatch many ships, and in February sent only three. After they proved ineffective, he took a larger force of 8 ships in March 1781, and fought a tactically inconclusive battle with the British fleet of Marriot Arbuthnot at the mouth of the Chesapeake Bay. Destouches withdrew due to the damage sustained to his fleet, leaving Arbuthnot and the British fleet in control of the bay's mouth.

On March 26, Arnold was joined by 2,300 troops under command of Major General William Phillips, who took command of the combined forces. Phillips resumed raiding, defeating the militia at Blandford, then burning the tobacco warehouses at Petersburg on April 25. Richmond was about to suffer the same fate, but Lafayette arrived. The British, not wanting to engage in a major battle, withdrew to Petersburg on May 10.

On May 20, Charles Cornwallis arrived at Petersburg with 1,500 men after suffering heavy casualties at the Battle of Guilford Courthouse. He immediately assumed command, as Phillips had recently died of a fever. Cornwallis had not received permission to abandon the Carolinas from his superior, Henry Clinton, but he believed that Virginia would be easier to capture, feeling that it would approve of an invading British army.

With the arrival of Cornwallis and more reinforcements from New York, the British Army numbered 7,200 men. Cornwallis wanted to push Lafayette, whose force now numbered 3,000 men with the arrival of Virginia militia. On May 24, he set out after Lafayette, who withdrew from Richmond, and linked forces with those under the command of Baron von Steuben and Anthony Wayne. Cornwallis did not pursue Lafayette. Instead, he sent raiders into central Virginia, where they attacked depots and supply convoys, before being recalled on June 20. Cornwallis then headed for Williamsburg, and Lafayette's force of now 4,500 followed him. General Clinton, in a confusing series of orders, ordered Cornwallis first to Portsmouth and then Yorktown, where he was instructed to build fortifications for a deep water port.

On July 6, the French and American armies met at White Plains, north of New York City. Although Rochambeau had almost 40 years of warfare experience, he never challenged Washington's authority, telling Washington he had come to serve, not to command.

Washington and Rochambeau discussed where to launch a joint attack. Washington believed an attack on New York was the best option, since the Americans and French now outnumbered the British defenders 3 to 1. Rochambeau disagreed, arguing the fleet in the West Indies under Admiral de Grasse was going to sail to the American coast, where easier options than attacking New York could be attempted.

In early July, Washington suggested an attack be made at the northern part of Manhattan Island, but his officers and Rochambeau all disagreed. Washington continued to probe the New York area until August 14, when he received a letter from de Grasse stating he was headed for Virginia with 28 warships and 3,200 soldiers, but could only remain there until October 14. De Grasse encouraged Washington to move south so they could launch a joint operation. Washington abandoned his plan to take New York, and began to prepare his army for the march south to Virginia.

March to Virginia 
On August 19, the "celebrated march" to Yorktown led by Washington and Rochambeau began. 7,000 soldiers (4,000 French and 3,000 American) began the march in Newport, Rhode Island, while the rest remained behind to protect the Hudson Valley. Washington wanted to maintain complete secrecy of their destination. To ensure this, he sent out fake dispatches that reached Clinton revealing that the Franco-American army was going to launch an attack on New York, and that Cornwallis was not in danger.

The French and American armies marched through Philadelphia from September 2 to 4, where the American soldiers announced they would not leave Maryland until they received one month's pay in coin, rather than in the worthless Continental paper currency. "Count de Rochabeau very readily agreed at Chester to supply at the Head of Elk twenty thousand hard dollars", half of his supply of gold Spanish coins. This would be the last time the men would be paid. This strengthened French and American relations. On September 5, Washington learned of the arrival of de Grasse's fleet off the Virginia Capes. De Grasse debarked his French troops to join Lafayette, and then sent his empty transports to pick up the American troops. Washington made a visit to his home, Mount Vernon, on his way to Yorktown.

In August, Admiral Sir Thomas Graves led a fleet from New York to attack de Grasse's fleet. Graves did not realize how large the French fleet was, and neither did Cornwallis. The British fleet was defeated by de Grasse's fleet in the Battle of the Chesapeake on September 5, and forced to fall back to New York. On September 14, Washington arrived in Williamsburg, Virginia.

The siege

Initial movements
On September 26, transports with artillery, siege tools, and some French infantry and shock troops from Head of Elk, the northern end of the Chesapeake Bay, arrived, giving Washington command of an army of 7,800 Frenchmen, 3,100 militia, and 8,000 Continentals. Early on September 28, Washington led the army out of Williamsburg to surround Yorktown. The French took the positions on the left while the Americans took the position of honor on the right. Cornwallis had a chain of seven redoubts and batteries linked by earthworks along with batteries that covered the narrows of the York River at Gloucester Point. That day, Washington reconnoitered the British defenses, and decided that they could be bombarded into submission. The Americans and the French spent the night of the 28th sleeping out in the open, while work parties built bridges over the marsh. Some of the American soldiers hunted down wild hogs to eat.

On September 29, Washington moved the army closer to Yorktown, and British gunners opened fire on the infantry. Throughout the day, several British cannon fired on the Americans, but there were few casualties. Fire was also exchanged between American riflemen and Hessian Jägers.

Cornwallis pulled back from all of his outer defenses, except for the Fusilier's redoubt on the west side of the town and redoubts 9 and 10 in the east. Cornwallis had his forces occupy the earthworks immediately surrounding the town because he had received a letter from Clinton that promised relief force of 5,000 men within a week and he wished to tighten his lines. The Americans and the French occupied the abandoned defenses and began to establish their batteries there. With the British outer defenses in their hands, allied engineers began to lay out positions for the artillery. The men improved their works and deepened their trenches. The British also worked on improving their defenses.

On September 30, the French attacked the British Fusiliers redoubt. The skirmish lasted two hours, in which the French were repulsed, suffering several casualties. On October 1, the allies learned from British deserters that, to preserve their food, the British had slaughtered hundreds of horses and thrown them on the beach. In the American camp, thousands of trees were cut down to provide wood for earthworks. Preparations for the parallel also began.

As the allies began to put their artillery into place, the British kept up a steady fire to disrupt them. British fire increased on the 2nd and the allies suffered moderate casualties. General Washington continued to make visits to the front, despite concern shown by several of his officers over the increasing enemy fire. On the night of October 2, the British opened a storm of fire to cover up the movement of the British cavalry to Gloucester where they were to escort infantrymen on a foraging party. On the 3rd, the foraging party, led by Banastre Tarleton, went out but collided with Lauzun's Legion, and John Mercer's Virginia militia, led by the Marquis de Choisy. The British cavalry quickly retreated behind their defensive lines, losing 50 men.

By October 5, Washington was almost ready to open the first parallel. That night the sappers and miners worked, putting strips of pine on the wet sand to mark the path of the trenches. The main/ initial movements of this battle were walking and riding horses.

Bombardment
After nightfall on October 6, troops moved out in stormy weather to dig the first parallel: the heavily overcast sky negated the waning full moon and shielded the massive digging operation from the eyes of British sentries. Washington ceremoniously struck several blows with his pickaxe to begin the trench. Half of the trench was to be commanded by the French, the other half by the Americans. On the northernmost end of the French line, a support trench was dug so that they could bombard the British ships in the river. The French were ordered to distract the British with a false attack, but the British were told of the plan by a French deserter and the British artillery fire turned on the French from the Fusiliers redoubt.

On October 7, the British saw the new allied trench just out of musket-range. Over the next two days, the allies completed the gun placements and dragged the artillery into line. The British fire began to weaken when they saw the large number of guns the allies had.

By October 9, all of the French and American guns were in place. Among the American guns there were three twenty-four pounders, three eighteen pounders, two eight-inch (203 mm) howitzers and six mortars, totaling fourteen guns. At 5:00 pm, the Americans opened fire. Washington fired the first gun; legend has it that this shot smashed into a table where British officers were eating. The Franco-American guns began to tear apart the British defenses. Washington ordered that the guns fire all night so that the British could not make repairs. All of the British guns on the left were soon silenced. The British soldiers began to pitch their tents in their trenches and soldiers began to desert in large numbers. Some British ships were also damaged by cannonballs that flew across the town into the harbor.

On October 10, the Americans spotted a large house in Yorktown. Believing that Cornwallis might be stationed there, they aimed at it and quickly destroyed it. Cornwallis sank more than a dozen of his ships in the harbor. The French began to fire at the British ships and scored a hit on the British , which caught fire, and in turn set two or three other ships on fire. Cornwallis received word from Clinton that the British fleet was to depart on October 12, however Cornwallis responded by saying that he would not be able to hold out for long.

On the night of October 11, Washington ordered that the Americans dig a second parallel. It was  closer to the British lines, but could not be extended to the river because the British number 9 and 10 redoubts were in the way. During the night, the British fire continued to land in the old line; Cornwallis did not suspect that a new parallel was being dug. By morning of the 12th, the allied troops were in position on the new line.

Assault on the redoubts

By October 14, the trenches were within  of redoubts No. 9 and No. 10. Washington ordered that all guns within range begin blasting the redoubts to weaken them for an assault that evening. Washington planned to use the cover of a moonless night to gain the element of surprise. To reinforce the darkness, he added silence, ordering that no soldier should load his musket until reaching the fortifications; the advance would be made with only "cold steel." Redoubt 10 was near the river and held only 70 men, while redoubt 9 was a quarter-mile inland, and was held by 120 British and Germans. Washington’s officers devised a plan in which the French would launch a diversionary attack on the Fusiliers redoubt, and then a half an hour later, the French would assault redoubt 9 and the Americans redoubt 10. Redoubt 9 would be assaulted by 400 French regular soldiers of the Royal Deux-Ponts Regiment under the command of the Count of Deux-Ponts and redoubt 10 would be assaulted by 400 light infantry troops under the command of Alexander Hamilton. There was a brief dispute as to who should lead the attack on Redoubt No. 10. Lafayette named his aide, Jean-Joseph Sourbader de Gimat, who commanded a battalion of Continental light infantry. However, Hamilton protested, saying that he was the senior officer. Washington concurred with Hamilton and gave him command of the attack.

At 6:30 pm, gunfire announced the diversionary attack on the Fusiliers redoubt. At other places in the line, movements were made as if preparing for an assault on Yorktown itself, which caused the British to panic. With bayonets fixed, the Americans marched towards Redoubt No. 10. Hamilton sent Lieutenant Colonel John Laurens around to the rear of the redoubt to prevent the British from escaping. The Americans reached the redoubt and began chopping through the British wooden defenses with their axes. A British sentry called a challenge, and then fired at the Americans. The Americans responded by charging with their bayonets towards the redoubt. They hacked through the abatis, crossed a ditch and climbed the parapet into the redoubt. The Americans forced their way into the redoubt, falling into giant shell holes created by the preparatory bombardment. The British fire was heavy, but the Americans overwhelmed them. Someone in the front shouted, "Rush on boys! The fort's ours!" The British threw hand grenades at the Americans with little effect. Men in the trench stood on the shoulders of their comrades to climb into the redoubt. The bayonet fight cleared the British from the redoubt and almost the entire garrison was captured, including the commander of the redoubt, Major Campbell. In the assault, the Americans lost 9 dead and 25 wounded.

The French assault began at the same time, but they were halted by the abatis, which was undamaged by the artillery fire. The French began to hack at the abatis and a Hessian sentry came out and asked who was there. When there was no response, the sentry opened fire as did other Hessians on the parapet. The French soldiers fired back, and then charged the redoubt. The Germans charged the Frenchmen climbing over the walls but the French fired a volley, driving them back. The Hessians then took a defensive position behind some barrels but threw down their arms and surrendered when the French prepared a bayonet charge.

With the capture of redoubts 9 and 10, Washington was able to have his artillery shell the town from three directions and the allies moved some of their artillery into the redoubts. On October 15, Cornwallis turned all of his guns onto the nearest allied position. He then ordered a storming party of 350 British troops under the command of Colonel Robert Abercromby to attack the allied lines and spike the American and French cannon (i.e., plug the touch hole with an iron spike). The allies were sleeping and unprepared. As the British charged Abercromby shouted "Push on my brave boys, and skin the bastards!" The British party spiked several cannons in the parallel and then spiked the guns on an unfinished redoubt. A French party came and drove them out of the allied lines and back to Yorktown. The British had been able to spike six guns, but by the morning they were all repaired. The bombardment resumed with the American and French troops engaged in competition to see who could do the most damage to the enemy defenses.

On the morning of October 16, more allied guns were in line and the fire intensified. In desperation, Cornwallis attempted to evacuate his troops across the York River to Gloucester Point. At Gloucester Point, the troops might be able to break through the allied lines and escape into Virginia and then march to New York. One wave of boats made it across, but a squall hit when they returned to take more soldiers, making the evacuation impossible.

British surrender

The fire on Yorktown from the allies was heavier than ever as new artillery pieces joined the line. Cornwallis talked with his officers that day and they agreed that their situation was hopeless.

On the morning of October 17, a drummer appeared, followed by an officer waving a white handkerchief. The bombardment ceased, and the officer was blindfolded and led behind the French and American lines. Negotiations began at the Moore House on October 18 between Lieutenant Colonel Thomas Dundas and Major Alexander Ross (who represented the British) and Lieutenant Colonel Laurens (who represented the Americans) and Marquis de Noailles (who represented the French). To make sure that nothing fell apart between the French and Americans at the last minute, Washington ordered that the French be given an equal share in every step of the surrender process. At 2:00 pm the allied army entered the British positions, with the French on the left and the Americans on the right.

The British had asked for the traditional honors of war, which would allow the army to march out with flags flying, bayonets fixed, and the band playing an American or French tune as a tribute to the victors. However, Washington firmly refused to grant the British the honors that they had denied the defeated American army the year before at the siege of Charleston. Consequently, the British and Hessian troops marched with flags furled and muskets shouldered, while the band was forced to play "a British or German march." American history books recount the legend that the British band played "The World Turn'd Upside Down", but the story may be apocryphal.

Cornwallis refused to attend the surrender ceremony, making it up that he had an illness. Instead, Brigadier General Charles O'Hara led the British army onto the field. O'Hara first attempted to surrender to Rochambeau, who shook his head and pointed to Washington. O'Hara then offered his sword to Washington, who also refused and motioned to Benjamin Lincoln, his second-in-command. The surrender finally took place when Lincoln accepted the sword of Cornwallis' deputy.

The British soldiers marched out and laid down their arms in between the French and American armies, while many civilians watched. At this time, the troops on the other side of the river in Gloucester also surrendered. The British soldiers had been issued new uniforms hours before the surrender and until prevented by General O'Hara some threw down their muskets with the apparent intention of smashing them. Others wept or appeared to be drunk. In all, 8,000 soldiers, 214 artillery pieces, thousands of muskets, 24 transport ships, wagons, and horses were captured.

Effect of disease
Malaria was endemic in the marshlands of eastern Virginia during the time, and Cornwallis's army suffered greatly from the disease; he estimated during the surrender that half of his army was unable to fight as a result. The Continental Army enjoyed an advantage, in that most of their members had grown up with malaria, and hence had acquired resistance to the disease. As malaria has a month-long incubation period, most of the French soldiers had not begun to exhibit symptoms before the surrender.

Articles of capitulation
The articles of capitulation, outlining the terms and conditions of surrender for officers, soldiers, military supplies, and personal property, were signed on October 19, 1781. Signatories included Washington, Rochambeau,, the Comte de Barras (on behalf of the French Navy), Cornwallis, and Captain Thomas Symonds (the senior Royal Navy officer present). Cornwallis' men were declared prisoners of war, promised good treatment in American camps, and officers were permitted to return home after taking their parole.

Articles of Capitulation, Yorktown
Article I. The garrisons of York and Gloucester including the officers and seamen of his Britannic Majesty's ships, as well as other mariners, to surrender themselves prisoners of war to the combined forces of America and France. The land troops to remain prisoners to the United States, the navy to the naval army of his Most Christian Majesty.
Granted.

Article II. The artillery, arms, accoutrements, military chest, and public stores of every denomination, shall be delivered unimpaired to the heads of departments appointed to receive them.
Granted.

Article III. At twelve o’clock this day the two redoubts on the left flank of York to be delivered, the one to a detachment of American infantry, the other to a detachment of French grenadiers.
Granted.

The garrison of York will march out to a place to be appointed in front of the posts, at two o’clock precisely, with shouldered arms, colors cased, and drums beating a British or German march. They are then to ground their arms, and return to their encampments, where they will remain until they are despatched to the places of their destination. Two works on the Gloucester side will be delivered at one o’clock to a detachment of French and American troops appointed to possess them. The garrison will march out at three o’clock in the afternoon; the cavalry with their swords drawn, trumpets sounding, and the infantry in the manner prescribed for the garrison of York. They are likewise to return to their encampments until they can be finally marched off.

Article IV. Officers are to retain their side-arms. Both officers and soldiers to keep their private property of every kind; and no part of their baggage or papers to be at any time subject to search or inspection. The baggage and papers of officers and soldiers taken during the siege to be likewise preserved for them.
Granted.

It is understood that any property obviously belonging to the inhabitants of these States, in the possession of the garrison, shall be subject to be reclaimed.

Article V. The soldiers to be kept in Virginia, Maryland, or Pennsylvania, and as much by regiments as possible, and supplied with the same rations of provisions as are allowed to soldiers in the service of America. A field-officer from each nation, to wit, British, Anspach, and Hessian, and other officers on parole, in the proportion of one to fifty men to be allowed to reside near their respective regiments, to visit them frequently, and be witnesses of their treatment; and that their officers may receive and deliver clothing and other necessaries for them, for which passports are to be granted when applied for.
Granted.

Article VI. The general, staff, and other officers not employed as mentioned in the above articles, and who choose it, to be permitted to go on parole to Europe, to New York, or to any other American maritime posts at present in the possession of the British forces, at their own option; and proper vessels to be granted by the Count de Grasse to carry them under flags of truce to New York within ten days from this date, if possible, and they to reside in a district to be agreed upon hereafter, until they embark. The officers of the civil department of the army and navy to be included in this article. Passports to go by land to be granted to those to whom vessels cannot be furnished.
Granted.

Article VII. Officers to be allowed to keep soldiers as servants, according to the common practice of the service. Servants not soldiers are not to be considered as prisoners, and are to be allowed to attend their masters.
Granted.

Article VIII. The Bonetta sloop-of-war to be equipped, and navigated by its present captain and crew, and left entirely at the disposal of Lord Cornwallis from the hour that the capitulation is signed, to receive an aid-de-camp to carry despatches to Sir Henry Clinton; and such soldiers as he may think proper to send to New York, to be permitted to sail without examination. When his despatches are ready, his Lordship engages on his part, that the ship shall be delivered to the order of the Count de Grasse, if she escapes the dangers of the sea. That she shall not carry off any public stores. Any part of the crew that may be deficient on her return, and the soldiers passengers, to be accounted for on her delivery.

Article IX. The traders are to preserve their property, and to be allowed three months to dispose of or remove them; and those traders are not to be considered as prisoners of war.

The traders will be allowed to dispose of their effects, the allied army having the right of preemption. The traders to be considered as prisoners of war upon parole.

Article X. Natives or inhabitants of different parts of this country, at present in York or Gloucester, are not to be punished on account of having joined the British army.

This article cannot be assented to, being altogether of civil resort.

Article XI. Proper hospitals to be furnished for the sick and wounded. They are to be attended by their own surgeons on parole; and they are to be furnished with medicines and stores from the American hospitals.

The hospital stores now at York and Gloucester shall be delivered for the use of the British sick and wounded. Passports will be granted for procuring them further supplies from New York, as occasion may require; and proper hospitals will be furnished for the reception of the sick and wounded of the two garrisons.

Article XII. Wagons to be furnished to carry the baggage of the officers attending the soldiers, and to surgeons when travelling on account of the sick, attending the hospitals at public expense.

They are to be furnished if possible.

Article XIII. The shipping and boats in the two harbours, with all their stores, guns, tackling, and apparel, shall be delivered up in their present state to an officer of the navy appointed to take possession of them, previously unloading the private property, part of which had been on board for security during the siege.
Granted.

Article XIV. No article of capitulation to be infringed on pretence of reprisals; and if there be any doubtful expressions in it, they are to be interpreted according to the common meaning and acceptation of the words.
Granted.

Done at Yorktown, in Virginia, October 19, 1781.

CornwallisThomas Symonds. 

Done in the Trenches before Yorktown, in Virginia, October 19, 1781.

George WashingtonLe Comte de RochambeauLe Comte de BarrasEn mon nom & celui du Comte de Grasse.

Article 10 controversy
George Washington refused to accept the Tenth Article of the Yorktown Articles of Capitulation, which granted immunity to provincials, and Cornwallis failed to make any effort to press the matter. "The outcry against the Tenth Article was vociferous and immediate, as Americans on both sides of the Atlantic proclaimed their sense of betrayal."

Aftermath

Following the surrender, the American and French officers entertained the British officers to dinner. The British officers were "overwhelmed" by the civility their erstwhile foes extended to them, with some French officers offering "profuse" sympathies for the defeat, as one British officer, Captain Samuel Graham, commented. Equally, the French aide to Rochambeau, Cromot du Bourg, noted the coolness of the British officers, particularly O'Hara, considering the defeat they had endured.

Five days after the battle ended, on October 24, 1781, the British fleet sent by Clinton to rescue the British army arrived. The fleet picked up several provincials who had escaped on October 18, and they informed Admiral Thomas Graves that they believed Cornwallis had surrendered. Graves picked up several more provincials along the coast, and they confirmed this fact. Graves sighted the French Fleet, but chose to leave because he was outnumbered by nine ships, and thus he sent the fleet back to New York.

On October 25, Washington issued an order which stipulated that all fugitive slaves who had joined the British were to be rounded up by the Continental Army and placed under the supervision of armed guards in fortified positions on both sides of the York River. There, they were to remain until "arrangements could be made to return them to their enslavers." Historian Gregory J. W. Urwin describes Washington's action as "[converting] his faithful Continentals—the men credited with winning American independence—into an army of slave catchers."

After the British surrender, Washington sent Tench Tilghman to report the victory to Congress. After a difficult journey, he arrived in Philadelphia, which celebrated for several days.  The British Prime Minister, Lord North, is reported to have exclaimed "Oh God, it's all over" when told of the defeat. Three months after the battle, a motion to end "further prosecution of offensive warfare on the continent of North America" -  effectively a no confidence motion - passed in the British House of Commons. Lord North and his government resigned.

Washington moved his army to New Windsor, New York where they remained stationed until the Treaty of Paris was signed on September 3, 1783, formally ending the war. Although the peace treaty did not happen for two years following the end of the battle, the Yorktown campaign proved to be decisive; there was no significant battle or campaign on the North American mainland after the Battle of Yorktown and in March 1782, "the British Parliament had agreed to cease hostilities."

Legacy

On October 19, 1881, an elaborate ceremony took place to honor the battle's centennial. U.S. naval vessels floated on Chesapeake Bay, and 
special markers highlighted where Washington and Lafayette's siege guns were placed. President Chester Arthur, sworn in only thirty days before, following James Garfield's death, made his first public speech as president. Also present were descendants of Lafayette, Rochambeau, de Grasse, and Steuben. To close the ceremony, Arthur gave an order to salute the British flag.

There is a belief that General Cornwallis's sword, surrendered by Charles O'Hara after the battle, is to this day on display at the White House. However, U.S. National Park Service historian Jerome Green, in his 2005 history of the siege, The Guns of Independence, concurs with the 1881 centennial account by Johnston, noting simply that when Brigadier General O'Hara presented the sword to Major General Lincoln, he held it for a moment and immediately returned it to O'Hara.

The siege of Yorktown is also known in some German historiographies as "die deutsche Schlacht" ("the German battle"), because Germans played significant roles in all three armies, accounting for roughly one third of all forces involved.  According to one estimate more than 2,500 German soldiers served at Yorktown with each of the British and French armies, and more than 3,000 German-Americans were in Washington's army.

Four Army National Guard units (113th Inf, 116th Inf, 175th Inf and 198th Sig Bn) and one active Regular Army Field Artillery battalion (1–5th FA) are derived from American units that participated in the Battle of Yorktown. There are thirty current U.S. Army units with lineages that go back to the colonial era.

Yorktown Victory Monument 

Five days after the British surrendered, Congress passed a resolution agreeing to erect a structure dedicated to commemorating those who participated in the battle. Construction of the monument was delayed, however, as the Confederation government had several other financial obligations that were considered to be of a more urgent nature. In 1834, the citizens of Yorktown asked Congress for the monument to be constructed, and then followed up once again in 1836, but still no action was taken. The desirability of the project was recognized in 1876 "when a memorial from the Common Council of Fredericksburg, Virginia was before Congress."

The project was postponed once again until the battle's centennial sparked renewed enthusiasm in the resolution and prompted the government to begin building the monument in 1881 amid national support. The crowning figure was set on August 12, 1884; the structure was officially reported in a communication as complete on January 5, 1885, and currently resides within Colonial National Historical Park. The artists commissioned by the Secretary of War for the monument project included Mr. R. M. Hunt (Chairman) and Mr. J. Q. A. Ward (Architect) of New York and Mr. Henry Van Brunt (Sculptor) of Boston.

Yorktown sesquicentennial and bicentennial celebrations 
A four-day celebration to commemorate the 150th anniversary of the siege took place in Yorktown on October 16–19, 1931. It was presided over by the Governor of Virginia John Garland Pollard and attended by then President Herbert Hoover along with French representatives. The event included the official dedication of the Colonial National Historical Park, which also includes Historic Jamestown.  President Ronald Reagan visited Yorktown in 1981 for the bicentennial celebration.

See also 
List of American Revolutionary War battles
List of George Washington articles
, for a list of U.S. Navy ships named after the battle

Notes

References

Citations

Bibliography

Further reading

 See search: Articles of capitulation

External links 

Yorktown Battlefield (National Park Service)
Articles of Capitulation at Yorktown.
The French Army in the American Revolution at the John Carter Brown Library
The Role of the Spanish and Cubans in the Siege of Yorktown 
The Yorktown Campaign (George Washington's Mount Vernon)

1781 in Virginia
Yorktown
Conflicts in 1781
Yorktown
Yorktown
York County in the American Civil War